Babylon Circus is a nine piece ska and reggae group founded in 1995 in Lyon, France. Since forming, they have released six full - length albums and one EP. They have played over 1500 shows throughout Europe, and have toured as far as Syria, Australia and South Africa

The band began as a ska group but quickly transcended the genre, mixing punk, reggae, rock, swing and jazz influences. They sing in both French and English, sometimes mixing the two in songs. Their third album, Dances of Resistance, was recorded in 2003 and largely has an anti-war theme. In 2009 they launched the album La Belle Étoile followed by Never Stop in 2013.
They are still on tour all over the world, from their own country France to other countries in Europe, but also to foreign places like Abu Dhabi and New Zealand.

Discography
1996: Demo 1
1997: Musika
1999: Tout va bien (EP)
2001: Au marché des illusions
2004: Dances of Resistance (Yelen Musiques/Sony Entertainment France, Rough Trade)
2009: La Belle étoile
2013: Never Stop
2020: State of Emergency

Members
David Baruchel - vocals, guitar
Manuel Nectoux - vocals
Christophe Millot - saxophone, clarinet, accordion, flute, bgv
Olivier Soumali - keyboards, bgv
Georges Chaccour - guitar, bgv
Clement Amirault - trombone, tuba, Barrel organ
Valentin Meylan - trumpet
Rémy Labordère - drums
Raph Vallade - bass

External links 
Official Web Site
Video: Live at Robodock, Amsterdam 2010

French ska groups
Musical groups from Lyon